Tamara Kaszala (born 29 November 1975) is a Hungarian short track speed skater. She competed in the women's 500 metres event at the 1992 Winter Olympics.

References

1975 births
Living people
Hungarian female short track speed skaters
Olympic short track speed skaters of Hungary
Short track speed skaters at the 1992 Winter Olympics
Speed skaters from Budapest